God Save the Rave is the twentieth studio album by German band Scooter, released on 16 April 2021 through Sheffield Tunes and Kontor Records. It is the first Scooter album not to be released after the usual one year-two year gap, being released almost four years after 2017's Scooter Forever. It is also the first and only studio album featuring Sebastian Schilde, who replaced Phil Speiser in 2019 and then departed from the band in December 2022, and the final studio album featuring Michael Simon who also left in December 2022 after being with the band since 2006.

Background
In April 2019, Scooter officially announced their new member Sebastian Schilde would be replacing Phil Speiser, after Speiser had been with the group since 2014. Their twentieth album was set to be released in the winter of 2020. It would be titled God Save the Rave and include 15 tracks. The album's tour, "The God Save the Rave tour" was originally expected to go ahead in the summer of 2020, but was postponed due to the COVID-19 pandemic. It is expected to take place in 2022. In December 2020, the album release date was postponed to 16 April 2021 due to the renewed lockdown.

Track listing

Notes
 "Анастасия" is pronounced Anastasia.
 On the vinyl edition of the album, the track "Wand'rin' Star" is replaced by another track "Lugosi".

Sample credits
 "We Love Hardcore" contains samples of the 1999 song "Kernkraft 400" by Zombie Nation.
 "Which Light Switch is Which?" contains samples of the 1995 song "Strings of Infinity" by T-Marc featuring Vincent.
 "FCK 2020" contains samples of the 2003 song "Pump It Loud" by The Pitcher.
 "Hang the DJ" contains samples of the 1993 song "Konvulsionslaten" by Anders Norudde.
 "Rave Teacher (Somebody Like Me)" contains an interpolation of the Mark With A K remix of the 2017 song "Somebody Like Me" as performed by Xillions.
 "Devil's Symphony" contains samples of Swan Lake Act 2, Scene 10 Moderato by Pjotr Iljitsch Tschaikowski.
 "These Days" contains samples of the 2015 song "Iyéwaye" by Oliver Koletzki.
 "Wand'rin' Star" is a cover version of the 1951 song of the same name.

Charts

References

2021 albums
Scooter (band) albums